Daniel Hogan (1899 – 1 August 1980) was an Irish Fianna Fáil politician. A farmer, he was elected at his second attempt to Dáil Éireann, as a Teachta Dála (TD) for the Leix–Offaly constituency at the 1938 general election. He lost his Dáil seat at the 1943 general election but was elected to the 4th Seanad on the Agricultural Panel. He was re-elected to the Seanad in 1944 but lost his Seanad seat in 1948. In 1957, he was again elected to the Seanad. He was re-elected in 1961 but lost his seat at the 1965 Seanad election.

References

1899 births
1980 deaths
Fianna Fáil TDs
Members of the 10th Dáil
Members of the 4th Seanad
Members of the 5th Seanad
Members of the 9th Seanad
Members of the 10th Seanad
Irish farmers
Fianna Fáil senators